Tal Geula Malkin (born 1970) is an Israeli-American cryptographer who works as a professor of computer science at Columbia University, where she heads the Cryptography Lab and the Data Science Institute Cybersecurity Center.

Education and career
Malkin graduated summa cum laude from Bar-Ilan University in 1993, with a bachelor's degree in mathematics and computer science. She earned a master's degree in computer science from Weizmann Institute of Science in 1995, with the master's thesis Deductive Tableaux for Temporal Logic supervised by Amir Pnueli, and completed a Ph.D. in 2000 at the Massachusetts Institute of Technology with the dissertation A Study of Secure Database Access and General Two-Party Computation supervised by Shafi Goldwasser.

As a doctoral student, she also worked as an intern for IBM Research at the Thomas J. Watson Research Center, and as a research scientist for AT&T Labs, continuing there through 2002. In 2003 she joined Columbia University as an assistant professor of computer science, earning tenure there in 2009.

Recognition
Malkin was named as a 2020 Fellow of the International Association for Cryptologic Research, "for foundational contributions, including black-box separations, multiparty computation, and tamper resilience, and for service to the IACR".

References

External links
Home page

1970 births
Living people
American computer scientists
American women computer scientists
American cryptographers
Israeli computer scientists
Israeli women computer scientists
Israeli cryptographers
Bar-Ilan University alumni
Weizmann Institute of Science alumni
Massachusetts Institute of Technology alumni
Columbia University faculty
21st-century American women